Broadway Express is an album by jazz trombonist and arranger J.J. Johnson and Orchestra featuring jazz version of Broadway musical songs conducted and arranged by Mundell Lowe and recorded in late 1965 for the RCA Victor label.

Reception

The Allmusic site awarded the album 3 stars.

Track listing
 "Come Back to Me" (Burton Lane, Alan Jay Lerner) - 2:09
 "Night Song" (Charles Strouse, Lee Adams) - 3:00
 "Once in a Lifetime" (Anthony Newley, Leslie Bricusse) - 2:13
 "More Than One Way" (Jimmy Van Heusen, Sammy Cahn) - 2:02
 "I Believe In You" (Frank Loesser) - 2:13
 "Goodbye, Old Girl" (Richard Adler, Jerry Ross) - 2:40
 "The Joker" (Newley, Bricusse) - 2:40
 "Sew the Buttons On" (John Jennings) - 2:06
 "Sunrise, Sunset" (Jerry Bock, Sheldon Harnick) - 2:25
 "Why Did I Choose You?" (Herbert Martin, Michael Leonard) - 2:04
 "Xanadu" (Gérard Calvi, Harold Rome) - 1:43
 "Something's Coming" (Leonard Bernstein, Stephen Sondheim) - 2:07

Personnel 
J. J. Johnson - trombone
Burt Collins, Joe Newman, Ernie Royal - trumpet
Wayne Andre, Dick Hixon - trombone
Tony Studd - bass trombone
James Buffington, Bob Northern - French horn 
Danny Bank, Phil Bodner, Jerome Richardson, Frank Wess - reeds 
Everett Barksdale, Kenny Burrell, Carl Lynch - guitar
Hank Jones - piano 
Richard Davis - bass 
Grady Tate - drums
Warrren Smith, Phil Kraus - percussion
Mundell Lowe - arranger, conductor

References 

1966 albums
RCA Records albums
J. J. Johnson albums